Qolian or Qolyan may refer to:
 Qolian (Armenia), a historic region of Armenia
 Qolyan, Kurdistan, a village in Kurdistan Province, Iran
 Qolian, Lorestan, a village in Lorestan Province, Iran